The Hellenic Handball Federation (OXE) is the governing body of handball and beach handball in Hellenic Republic (Greece). Founded in 1979, OXE is affiliated to the International Handball Federation and European Handball Federation. OXE is also affiliated to the Hellenic Olympic Committee and the  Mediterranean Handball Confederation. It is based in Athens.

OXE Competitions
 Greek Men's Handball Championship
 Greek Women's Handball Championship
 Greek Men's Handball Cup
 Greek Women's Handball Cup
 A2 Ethniki Handball

National teams
 Greece men's national handball team
 Greece men's national junior handball team
 Greece men's national youth handball team
 Greece women's national handball team
 Greece women's national junior handball team
 Greece women's national youth handball team

Competitions hosted

International

 1991 Men's Junior World Handball Championship
 2004 Summer Olympics
 2011 Men's Junior World Handball Championship
 2021 Men's Youth World Handball Championship (Future event)

References

External links
 Official website (Only Greek Language)
 Hellenic Handball Federation at IHF site

Members
1979 establishments in Greece
Handball
Sports organizations established in 1979
Handball governing bodies